The Leaders of the Opposition of India are the politicians who lead the official opposition in either House of the Parliament of India. The Leader of the Opposition is the parliamentary chairperson of the largest political party in their respective legislative chamber that is not in government.

While the position also existed in former Central Legislative Assembly of British India, and holders of it there included Motilal Nehru, it received statutory recognition through the Salary and Allowances of Leaders of Opposition in Parliament Act, 1977 which defines the term "Leader of the Opposition" as that member of the Lok Sabha or the Rajya Sabha who, for the time being, is the Leader of that House of the Party in Opposition to the Government having the greatest numerical strength and recognised, as such, by the Chairman of the Rajya Sabha or the Speaker of the Lok Sabha. 

As per the Salary and Allowances of Leaders of Opposition in Parliament Act, 1977 by which the post has got official and statutory status, the majority required is decided by the heads of the houses, that is speaker and chairman as the case may be. Clause 4 of The Central Vigilance Commission Act, 2003, provides for the leader of the largest opposition party to be inducted as a member of the selection committee in a scenario where the lower house of parliament does not have a recognised leader of the opposition.

Deputy Leader of the Opposition                                  
A Second Chairman for secondary party in parliamentary is called Deputy Opposition leader. This is not a official post, but some this post use to political issues on same party.

See also
Leader of the Opposition in Rajya Sabha 
Leader of the Opposition in Lok Sabha

References 

India
Parliament of India
Leaders of the Opposition